Hardy may refer to:

People
 Hardy (surname)
 Hardy (given name)
 Hardy (singer), American singer-songwriter

Places

Antarctica
 Mount Hardy, Enderby Land
 Hardy Cove, Greenwich Island
 Hardy Rocks, Biscoe Islands

Australia
 Hardy, South Australia, a locality
 Cape Hardy, a headland in South Australia
 Hardy Inlet, Western Australia

Canada
 Hardy Township, Ontario, Canada, administered by the Loring, Port Loring and District, Ontario, services board
 Port Hardy, British Columbia
 Hardy, Saskatchewan, Canada, a hamlet

United States

 Hardy, Arkansas, a city
 Hardy, California, an unincorporated community
 Hardy, Iowa, a city
 Hardy, Kentucky, an unincorporated community
 Hardy, Mississippi, an unincorporated community
 Hardy, Montana, an unincorporated community
 Hardy, Nebraska, a village
 Hardy, Virginia, an unincorporated community
 Hardy County, West Virginia
 Hardy Dam, Michigan
 Hardy Lake, Indiana, a state reservoir
 Hardy Pond, Massachusetts
 Hardy Toll Road, Texas
 Hardy Township, Holmes County, Ohio

Elsewhere
 Hardy Peninsula, Chile
 Hardy River, Mexico
 Hardy Town, Gibraltar, a temporary civilian settlement during a Napoleonic Wars siege
 Hardy Way, a long-distance footpath in southern England
 Hardy Point, Bellingshausen Island in the South Sandwich Islands
 2866 Hardy, an asteroid

Ships 
 Hardy class destroyer, a Royal Navy class of two ships in commission from 1895 to 1912
 HMS Hardy, various Royal Navy ships

Businesses
 Hardy Oil and Gas, a British company 
 The Hardy Wine Company, an Australian wine company

Other uses
 The Hardy Boys, a detective series about two teenage brothers and amateur detectives
 The Hardy Boyz, a professional wrestling tag team consisting of real-life brothers Matt and Jeff Hardy
 Hardy baronets, two titles in the Baronetage of the United Kingdom, both extinct
  Hardy Fishing Rods, a brand of fishing rods owned by Newell Brands
 Hardy (hill), a category of hill in the United Kingdom
 Hardy Monument, Dorset, United Kingdom
 Hardy Memorial Tower, San Diego State University, San Diego, California, United States
 Hardy Cup, a Canadian ice hockey trophy
 Hardy tool, a type of accessory tool used with an anvil
 Hardy (locomotive), a locomotive at the Dinorwic quarry

See also
 Hardee (disambiguation)
 Hardiness (disambiguation)
 Hardys (disambiguation)